Walnut Park West is a neighborhood of St. Louis, Missouri.  The Walnut Park West neighborhood is situated in northwest St. Louis. It is bounded by West Florissant Avenue to the northeast, Riverview Boulevard to the southeast, Interstate Highway 70 (I-70) to the south, and the City limits (St. Louis County and the City of Jennings) to the west and northwest.

Demographics

In 2010 Walnut Park West's racial makeup was 95.1% Black, 0.8% White, 0.1% Asian, 0.2% American Indian, 3.4% Two or More Races, and 0.4% Some Other Race. 0.8% of the population was of Hispanic or Latino origin.

References

Neighborhoods in St. Louis